12 de Janeiro (January 12th) is the first solo album released by Brazilian musician Nando Reis. The track "E.T.C" was later recorded live by Cássia Eller on her Acústico MTV album, and became a big hit. Until November 1995, it had sold 25,000 copies, a disappointment for Reis, who considered that the label was to blame because "some songs performed well on the radio, but there were no CDs at the stores". By August 1997, it had reached the 27,300 mark.

The track "Meu Aniversário" was composed as a heavier version for Titãs' 1993 album Titanomaquia, but the band rejected it because it was still too light and different from the rest of the tracks. Nevertheless, it was featured at the band's rarities compilation album E-collection. The track "Bom Dia" was inspired by his children Theodoro and Sophia.

Reis invited his friend Cássia Eller to do  duet with him on the song "Fiz o Que Pude", but the label denied it, according to him, claiming that the presence of a more famous artist would "shift the audience's focus".

Track listing

References 

1994 debut albums
Nando Reis albums
Warner Music Group albums
Portuguese-language albums